The BBC Own It is a British information site designed to protect and support children using the Internet. While the BBC Own It app has been retired, the Own It website still provides online safety advice to children, parents and teachers.

As part of the BBC's partnership with Internet Matters, the not-for-profit contributes to content on the BBC Own It website.

History 
In 2016, The Royal Foundation of The Duke and Duchess of Cambridge established The Royal Foundation Taskforce on the Prevention of Cyberbullying. The BBC Own It App work began in 2017 in response to a call for action from the Taskforce.

In December 2017, the BBC launched Own It. In November 2018, work on the BBC Own It App was announced by Prince William. In September 2019, the BBC Own It App was launched into the AppStore and Google Play.

In 2022, the app was retired. However, the website is still active.

Awards 
 UXUK award for Best Education or Learning Experience (2019)
 Banff World Media Festival Rockies Award for Children & Youth Interactive Content (2020)
 CogX Award for Best Innovation In Natural Language Processing  (2020)

External links 
Own It

References 

BBC children's television shows
Cyberbullying
Mobile applications